Jane Coles is a British playwright. She won the 1994 Susan Smith Blackburn Prize.

Works

Plays
 Backstroke in a Crowded Pool, 1993
 Cat with Green Violin, 1991
 Crossing the Equator, 1995
 Low Flying Aircraft, 1999
 Cat With Green Violin, 2004
 The Ultimate Fudge

Criticism

References

External links
JANE COLES, doollee

British dramatists and playwrights
Year of birth missing (living people)
Living people